Svarog Films (Russian: Сварог Фильм) is a Russian independent film company founded in 1998 in St.Petersburg. In 2007 Svarog Films entered into a Russian-American co-production for the film Kerosene Cowboys, set for release in 2009.

Projects 
Empire under Strike (Империя по ударом),
Spetznaz, (Спецназ)
Russian Spetznaz, (Русский Спецназ) 
Spetznaz-2, (Спецназ-2)
Russian Spetznaz-2, (Спецназ по-русски - 2)
Golden Meduza, (Золотая медуза)
Polumgla, (Полумгла)
The SUN, (Солнце)
Elegy of Life. Rostropovich, Vishnevskaya.,
1812

Awards 
TEFI – Russian National TV award, Best TV film nomination, 2001
International stunt festival "PROMETHEUS", Best stunt film of the year, 2002
Golden Eagle Award – Russian National cinema award, Best film of the year, 2003
TEFI – Russian National TV award, Best TV film nomination, 2003
«LAW & SOCIETY» – International film festival, First Prise, 2003
"PIXEL" – National VFX and computer arts festival, Best film computer graphics and VFX, 2003
"PIXEL" – National VFX and computer arts festival, Audience sympathy prise, 2003
«LAW & SOCIETY» – International film festival, First Prise, 2004
International stunt festival "PROMETHEUS", Best stunt film of the year, 2004

References

External links 
Svarog Films

Film production companies of Russia
Mass media companies established in 1998
Companies based in Saint Petersburg